Adam Possamai is a sociologist and novelist born in Belgium and living in Australia. Possamai is professor in sociology and the Deputy Dean (research and international) in the School of Social Sciences and Psychology at Western Sydney University, New South Wales, Australia. He is the former Director of the Religion and Society Research Centre (RSRC) He is married to Alphia Possamai-Inesedy, and lives in the south-western suburbs of Sydney with his family.

Possamai is the former President of the Australian Association for the Study of Religions. He was the 2002-2007 co-editor of the Australian Religion Studies Review and is the former President of the sociology of religion section (RC22) of the International Sociological Association (2010-2014).

At present Possamai is researching the interrelation between migrants and New Religious Movements, the implications of consumer and popular culture on religion, law and religion, popular religion in late modernity, Muslim indigenous populations and Sydney as a post-secular city.

Education
Possamai's undergraduate studies in sociology were undertaken at the University of Leuven, Belgium, where he graduated with a Bachelor of Social Sciences (Hons). The topic of his undergraduate thesis was the Theosophical Society. He also obtained a Graduate Diploma of Education from the University of Leuven. He obtained his PhD from La Trobe University, Victoria, Australia, with a dissertation on New Age spirituality. His dissertation won the Jean Martin Award for the best PhD. in sociology in Australia (1998–1999).

Career
Possamai began his teaching career as a tutor at La Trobe University (1995–1998), and then in 1999 received an appointment as lecturer in sociology at the University of Western Sydney. In addition to teaching introductory courses in Sociology, he has also taught courses in the sociology of religion, sociology of migration, sociological theory, sociology of power and deviance, and the philosophy of social sciences. Perles Noires, his first book of fiction, was listed as one of the favourite books by the public libraries in Paris in 2006. He has also recently published the science fiction novel Le XXIe siècle de Dickerson et Ferra.

Publications

Contributions to academia

A large portion of Possamai's published work is premised on a neo-Weberian approach to the sociology of religion and popular culture. His contributions to the study of religion and popular culture are being acclaimed as significant works. In exploring the manner in which the internet has become a source of religious inspiration (as well as a forum for religious expression), Possamai has discussed the emergence of what he dubs "hyper-real religions". This is an entirely new theoretical framework for conceptualising consumerism in religion in the context of globalization. He detects a synergy between various stories and icons of popular culture and the role of the individual to create a new religious message. Possamai explores the intersection between late modernity and spirituality, noting the emphasis on the authority of the self replacing external forms of conventional religious authority (such as authority vested in imams, priests and rabbis, or in communally interpreted sacred texts). Hyper-real religions constitute new forms of spirituality where traditional and modern religious ideas are consumed and projected into completely reconstructed forms. Examples cited by Possamai include the Church of All Worlds, the Church of Satan, and Jedi religion (Jediism, see also Jedi census phenomenon). Carole Cusack in her book Invented Religions: Imagination, Fiction and Faith stated that "Adam Possamai,... to date is the only sociologist of religion (indeed the only scholar) to examine it [Jediism] in any detail prior to this study" (p 124). His work also considers the complex interplay between fundamentalist Christian groups that resist the synergy between popular culture and religion (as in the phenomenon of Harry Potter, fantasy-role playing games), and yet reappropriate aspects of pop culture to promote fundamentalism.

The second area of scholarly innovation is found in Possamai's work on New Age spirituality. On the basis of both field research in alternative spirituality festivals and new theoretical approaches, Possamai has contested the scholarly status quo in the interpretation and classification of New Age spirituality. His field research demonstrates that very few practitioners of what scholars call New Age, actually accept the term. He argues that the term New Age is imprecise and the previous scholarly conceptualisations of New Age are either limited or misleading. In his new schema, New Age spirituality is but one facet of a much wider cultural phenomenon that he has dubbed a perennist spirituality. It follows that by culturally consuming selected practices, myths, and teachings from pre-modern times, and then reframing them for the contemporary scene, seekers aspire to personal transformation and perhaps resolving global woes.

At the heart of this conceptualisation of reality lies a commitment to what Possamai has dubbed "perennism", the notion that a holistic understanding of truth is accessible in esoteric wisdom or gnosis that is unfettered by the dogmas of the world's religions. According to Possamai, the key features of perennism are that in this syncretic spirituality the cosmos is interpreted as a monistic reality, which partakes of a single unifying being, or principle, and all parts of the cosmos are inter-related to this ultimate reality. Those who participate in this spirituality are engaged in self-development to attain their potential, and they pursue spiritual knowledge of both self and ultimate reality.

See also
Perennialism
Self religion

References

External links 
 UWS Expert Directory
 Adam Possamai on Academia.edu

Belgian academics
21st-century Belgian novelists
Belgian male novelists
Belgian sociologists
Living people
Sociologists of religion
Researchers of new religious movements and cults
1970 births
Academic staff of Western Sydney University
21st-century Belgian male writers
Australian sociologists
Hyperreality theorists